Cos Cob station is a commuter rail stop on the Metro-North Railroad's New Haven Line, located in the Cos Cob district of Greenwich, Connecticut.

History 

On December 25, 1848, the last section of track on the railroad from New Haven to New York was completed over the Cos Cob Bridge. The first trial run was made on that day.

The New York and New Haven Railroad was merged into the New York, New Haven and Hartford Railroad in 1872, and the station became part of that railroad. Beginning in 1907, the NYNH&H built the Cos Cob power plant as part of an effort to electrify the main line. As with all New Haven Line stations along the Northeast Corridor, the station became a Penn Central station upon acquisition by Penn Central Railroad in 1969, and eventually became part of the MTA's Metro-North Railroad in 1983. The station was added to the National Register of Historic Places in 1989.

Station layout
The station has two high-level side platforms each six cars long. 

The station has 567 parking spaces, 361 owned by the state.

It has a clapboarded exterior, and an asymmetrical gabled roof with a short face toward the track, caused by the loss of the original platform shelter. The interior retains most of its original finishes. It was listed on the National Register of Historic Places in 1989 as Cos Cob Railroad Station. The nearby Mianus River Railroad Bridge is also listed on the National Register. The Cos Cob Power Station, a former New Haven Railroad electrical substation on the western edge of that bridge, is also NRHP-registered despite being demolished during the turn of the millennium.

See also 
 National Register of Historic Places listings in Greenwich, Connecticut

References

External links

Condition Inspection for the Cos Cob Station; Connecticut Department of Transportation report, November 2002
Fairfield County Listings on the National Register of Historic Places
http://www.ct.gov/dot/lib/dot/documents/dpt/1_Station_Inspection_Summary_Report.pdf

Metro-North Railroad stations in Connecticut
Stations on the Northeast Corridor
Stations along New York, New Haven and Hartford Railroad lines
Railroad stations in Fairfield County, Connecticut
Buildings and structures in Greenwich, Connecticut
Railway stations on the National Register of Historic Places in Connecticut
National Register of Historic Places in Fairfield County, Connecticut
Railway stations in the United States opened in 1848